Robert Edward Armstrong (24 July 191119 February 1988) was a senior Australian public servant and policy maker. Between May 1971 and June 1974 he was Secretary of the Department of Immigration.

Life and career
Bob Armstrong was born on 24 July 1911 in Erskinville, Sydney.

In 1940, Armstrong enlisted in the Australian Imperial Force. Posted to the 7th Division headquarters as a clerk, he served in Egypt, Palestine, Africa, Syria and Java.

Between 1971 and 1974, he was Secretary of the Department of Immigration.

Armstrong died in Canberra on 19 February 1988.

Awards
In 1967, Armstrong was made an Officer of the Order of the British Empire while Assistant Secretary of the Immigration Department.

References

1911 births
1988 deaths
Australian public servants
Australian Officers of the Order of the British Empire
Secretaries of the Australian Government Immigration Department
People from Sydney
Australian Army personnel of World War II
Australian Army soldiers